Post-void dribbling occurs when urine remaining in the urethra after voiding the bladder slowly leaks out after urination. A common and usually benign complaint, it may be a symptom of urethral diverticulum, prostatitis and other medical problems.

Some men who experience dribbling, especially after prostate cancer surgery, will choose to wear incontinence pads to stay dry. Also known as guards for men, these incontinence pads conform to the male body. Some of the most popular male guards are from TENA, Depend, and Prevail. Simple ways to prevent dribbling include: strengthening pelvic muscles with Kegel exercises, changing position while urinating, or pressing on the perineum to evacuate the remaining urine from the urethra. Sitting down while urinating is also shown to alleviate complaints: a meta-analysis on the effects of voiding position in elderly males with benign prostate hyperplasia found an improvement of urologic parameters in this position, while in healthy males no such influence was found.

References

External links 

  eMedicine

Symptoms and signs: Urinary system